The Burning Season is a 1993 Canadian film directed by Harvey Crossland. The film stars Akesh Gill, Jasminder K. Rattan, Om Puri and Dale Azzard. The plot concerns a young Indo-Canadian wife and mother who runs away to India in pursuit of her lover.

References

External links
 

1993 films
Films about Indian Canadians
Canadian drama films
1993 drama films
Films set in Vancouver
Films shot in Vancouver
1990s Canadian films